Cassida azurea is a species of tortoise beetle in the family Chrysomelidae. It is found in Europe and Northern Asia (excluding China). Has been introduced in North America to control the invasive plant Silene vulgaris.

References

Further reading

External links

 

Cassidinae
Articles created by Qbugbot
Beetles described in 1801